KOHI (1600 AM) is a radio station in St. Helens, 29 miles north of Portland, Oregon on U.S. Route 30. It serves the cities of St. Helens, Scappoose, Salmon Creek, La Center, Woodland, and Kalama, the last four of which are located in Washington. The station is owned by The Mountain Broadcasting and is also affiliated with Liberty News Radio Network, Talkstar Talk Radio Network and Accent Radio Network; it is also broadcast live on radiotime.com.

First put on the air in 1960, AM-1600 KOHI has been serving eastern Columbia County for over 50 years. It also airs in part of western Cowlitz County, Washington.

KOHI features local news, weather, information about school closings, and information about upcoming events; programs it airs include [], Liberty Roundtable and locally produced Sports Talk Saturday at 9am. It airs the internationally syndicated program The X-Zone with Rob McConnell, which deals with paranormal topics including parapsychology and UFOs. KOHI's local news program is called Columbia County Magazine, it is hosted by Marty Rowe and features community information and discussions on topics including volunteerism. In 2009, KOHI ran "Lucky Jim's Fishing Show", a fictitious radio sitcom written and directed by local Hillsboro policeman Michael Rouches and producer Alex Rowe somewhat based on Rouches personal experiences. As of August 2011, the station also runs meetings of the Columbia County Board of Commissioners. KOHI also broadcasts old time radio shows under the label KOHI Radio Theatre.

It also broadcasts Clean Columbia County's Odd Friday every Friday from 9am to 10am.  Odd Friday is a local call in talk show with Tammy Maygra, Brady Preheim  discussing local political, environmental and other odd topics. Nancy Ward left the show in January 2021.

It is the only AM broadcast station in Columbia County.

References

External links
KOHI official website

OHI
News and talk radio stations in the United States
St. Helens, Oregon
1960 establishments in Oregon
Radio stations established in 1960